This is a list of reptile species found in Poland

Testudines 
Family: Emydidae

 European pond turtle (Emys orbicularis)
 Pond slider (Trachemys scripta) - introduced species

Squamata 
Family: Lacertidae

 Sand lizard (Lacerta agilis)
 European green lizard (Lacerta viridis) - most likely locally extinct in Poland
 Viviparous lizard (Zootoca vivipara)
 European wall lizard (Podarcis muralis) - cryptogenic species

Family: Anguidae

 Slow worm (Anguis fragilis)
 Eastern slowworm (Anguis colchica)
Family: Colubridae

 Grass snake (Natrix natrix)
 Dice snake (Natrix tessellata)
 Aesculapian snake (Zamenis longissimus)
 Smooth snake (Coronella austriaca)

Family: Viperidae

 Common European adder (Vipera berus)

See also 
Fauna of Poland

References

Reptiles
Poland
Reptiles
Poland